Mouard Satli (born 29 January 1990) is an Algerian professional footballer who plays as a defender.

Club career
Satli was born in Oran, Algeria. At the age of 9, he started playing with a small club in Paris before joining the INF Clairefontaine academy when he was 13, spending the next three years there. In 2006, he joined RC Strasbourg.

In 2010, Satli signed a two-year contract with Belgian Pro League club Sporting Charleroi. He was immediately loaned out to second division side Boussu Dour Borinage for the 2010–2011 season., making 32 appearances for the club. In the summer of 2012, he extended his contract with Charleroi until 2014. On 28 July 2012, Satli made his Belgian Pro League debut as a starter against Mechelen in the opening round of the 2012–13 Belgian Pro League season being regular since then.

In June 2014, Satli was transferred to Petrolul Ploiești in Romania. He moved back to Belgium in August 2015, signing a one-year contract with KV Mechelen. After one year he left, and was without a club until he signed an 18 month deal with Algerian side NA Hussein Dey in December 2016.

In August 2017, Satli signed with the Parisian club Red Star FC.

In January 2019, he moved to Qatar with Umm Salal.

Honours

Royal Charleroi SC
Division II: 2011–12 

Red Star FC
Championnat National: 2017–18

References

External links
 

Living people
1990 births
Footballers from Oran
Association football defenders
French footballers
R. Charleroi S.C. players
R.F.C. Seraing (1922) players
FC Petrolul Ploiești players
Red Star F.C. players
Umm Salal SC players
Muaither SC players
Liga I players
Qatar Stars League players
Qatari Second Division players
Belgian Pro League players
Challenger Pro League players
Expatriate footballers in Belgium
Expatriate footballers in Romania
Expatriate footballers in Qatar
French expatriate sportspeople in Belgium
French expatriate sportspeople in Romania
Algerian expatriate sportspeople in Qatar
Algerian emigrants to France
Naturalized citizens of France
Francs Borains players